Baptarma is a genus of moths of the family Noctuidae.

Species
 Baptarma felicita Smith, 1904

References
 Baptarma at Markku Savela's Lepidoptera and Some Other Life Forms
 Natural History Museum Lepidoptera genus database

Heliothinae